5264 Telephus  is a large Jupiter trojan from the Greek camp, approximately  in diameter. It was discovered on 17 May 1991, by American astronomer couple Carolyn and Eugene Shoemaker at the Palomar Observatory in California, and later named after King Telephus from Greek mythology. The dark and possibly elongated D-type asteroid belongs to the 50 largest Jupiter trojans and has a rotation period of 9.5 hours.

Classification and orbit 

Telephus is a dark Jovian asteroid orbiting in the leading Greek camp at Jupiter's  Lagrangian point, 60° ahead of the Gas Giant's orbit in a 1:1 resonance (see Trojans in astronomy). It is also a non-family asteroid in the Jovian background population.

It orbits the Sun at a distance of 4.6–5.8 AU once every 11 years and 11 months (4,342 days; semi-major axis of 5.21 AU). Its orbit has an eccentricity of 0.11 and an inclination of 34° with respect to the ecliptic. The body's observation arc begins with a precovery taken at Palomar in January 1989, more than 2 years prior to its official discovery observation.

Physical characteristics 

In both the Tholen- and SMASS-like taxonomy of the Small Solar System Objects Spectroscopic Survey (S3OS2), Telephus is a D-type asteroid. In the SDSS-based taxonomy, it is also a D-type, while the Collaborative Asteroid Lightcurve Link (CALL) assumes it to be a C-type.

Rotation period 

In June 1994, photometric observations of this asteroid by astronomers Stefano Mottola and Anders Erikson with the Dutch 0.9-metre Telescope at ESO's La Silla Observatory, Chile, were used to build a lightcurve. It showed a rotation period of 9.518 hours with a brightness amplitude of  magnitude.

In May 2015, Telephus was observed in Chile, using the 4-meter Víctor M. Blanco Telescope and its DECam with a red filter in Chile. The lightcurve gave a concurring period of 9.540 hours and an brightness variation of 0.20 in magnitude. In May 2016, follow-up observation by Robert Stephens and Daniel Coley at the Center for Solar System Studies, California, and Linda French at Wesleyan University gave the so-far best rated period of  hours with an amplitude of 0.47. Due to its higher than usual brightness variation, this Jovian asteroid is likely to have a non-spherical shape.

Diameter and albedo 

According to the surveys carried out by the Infrared Astronomical Satellite IRAS, the Japanese Akari satellite, and the NEOWISE mission of NASA's Wide-field Infrared Survey Explorer, the asteroid measures between 68.47 and 81.38 kilometers in diameter and its surface has an albedo between 0.043 and 0.072. CALL agrees with the results obtained by IRAS, and derives an albedo of 0.0571 with a diameter of 73.33 kilometers, based on an absolute magnitude of 9.4.

Naming 

This minor planet was named from Greek mythology after King Telephus. He is the grandson of Zeus and son of Heracles, after whom the Apollo near-Earth asteroids 5731 Zeus and 5143 Heracles were named, respectively. Telephus was the son-in-law of King Priam of Troy, but fought with the Greeks in the Trojan War. The official naming citation was published by the Minor Planet Center on 12 July 1995.

Notes

References

External links 
 Asteroid Lightcurve Database (LCDB), query form (info )
 Dictionary of Minor Planet Names, Google books
 Discovery Circumstances: Numbered Minor Planets (5001)-(10000) – Minor Planet Center
 
 

005264
Discoveries by Carolyn S. Shoemaker
Discoveries by Eugene Merle Shoemaker
Named minor planets
19910517